Mantfombi Shiyiwe Dlamini Zulu (15 February 1953 – 29 April 2021) was the queen consort of the Zulu nation from 1977 to 2021 as the Great Wife to King Goodwill Zwelithini. She served as the queen regent from March 2021 to April 2021.

Early life and family
Queen Mantfombi Dlamini was born on 15 February 1953  to the House of Dlamini. Born to King Sobhuza II of Swaziland and Princess Manoni, who was herself the granddaughter of King Mbandzeni, a former Swati king, Mantfombi's father Sobhuza II, as Ngwenyama of the Swazi Nation, became the King of Swaziland at independence in 1968. Queen Mantfombi's brother, Sobhuza's successor Mswati III, would ultimately change their country's name to Eswatini in 2018.

Her family forged links with other African dynasties: her brother, Prince Thumbumuzi Dlamini, married into the Mandela chieftaincy family of Mvezo in the same year as her betrothal. Through this union, she gained Zenani Mandela-Dlamini as a sister-in-law.

The Queen was a member of the Seventh-day Adventist Church.

Queen consort
After a traditional upbringing in the Swazi royal family, the princess was betrothed to King Goodwill Zwelithini of the Zulu Nation in 1973. At the time of their betrothal, she was a member of the royal family of a sovereign state.  Her intended husband was a chief recognised by the South African government as the traditional authority of Zululand.  Considering their relative dynastic seniority, the Swazi palace laid a condition for the marriage: the princess was to become the King's Great Wife, a position that would give her male children first place in the line of succession. The Zulu agreed, and the couple married in 1977.

Queen regent
She was appointed as the interim leader of the Zulu Nation under the title of queen regent, on 24 March 2021, after the death of His Majesty King Goodwill Zwelithini on 12 March 2021. This was in accordance with King Zwelithini's will, and she was set to temporarily serve in this capacity until the next Zulu king was appointed. Had she survived, she would also have appointed the next king; her first son, Misuzulu Zulu, was believed to have been her choice.

Death 
On 27 April 2021, the royal family confirmed that Queen Mantfombi Dlamini had been hospitalized. She died two days later on 29 April 2021. The family did not immediately release the details of the cause of death.

Prince Mangosuthu Buthelezi described her death as "unexpected". KwaZulu-Natal Premier Sihle Zikalala called the news "heart-wrenching" and said the Queen was a bridge between the Zulu and eSwatini nations. He called her leadership role an inspiration for women, which helped to "administer the final burial rites to the backward, patriarchal and chauvinistic tendencies that considered women as inferior beings".

On the following day, Prince Buthelezi confirmed that the Queen died around 20:15 at the Netcare Milpark Hospital in Johannesburg. He further announced that the Queen had been suffering from a long-term illness; this was known to the palace but not revealed publicly.  After recovering from COVID-19, she was admitted to a hospital in Durban for a previously scheduled operation to remove gallstones.  As she was too weak to undergo surgery, she saw another doctor in Johannesburg, and was later hospitalized.

Children
Queen Mantfombi and King Goodwill had eight children. They are as follows:
 King Misuzulu Zulu, born 23 September 1974 in Kwahlabisa, KwaZulu-Natal. He studied International Studies in Jacksonville, Florida. He was appointed king by his mother before her death, and was crowned in August 2022. 
 Princess Ntandoyesizwe Zulu, born 28 June 1976. Married to Moses Tembe
 Princess Nomkhosi Magogo Zulu
 Princess Bukhosibemvelo Zulu, married in 2007 to Sipho Nyawo, who paid 120 cows as part of the ilobolo for her.
 Prince Bambindlovu Makhosezwe Zulu
 Prince Lungelo Zulu
 Prince Mandlesizwe Zulu
 Prince Simangaye Zulu

See also
 Monarchies in Africa
 Zulu Kingdom
 Zulu royal family
 KwaZulu-Natal

References

Monarchs of South Africa
African traditional governments
African queens
South African Seventh-day Adventists
1953 births
2021 deaths
Female regents
Zulu royalty
Swazi royalty
Daughters of kings